The Sunuwar Alphabet (previously the Jenticha script, occasionally Kõits script) is an alphabet developed by Krishna Bahadur Jentich in 1942, to write the Sunwar language, a member of the Kiranti language family spoken in Eastern Nepal, as in Sikkim. It is recognised in Sikkim and used as an official writing system. The alphabet has 33 letters, 10 numerals and 1 'auspicious sign'. 

It is a grammatological isolate, though some symbols bear recognition to the Limbu and Latin scripts. The script is written left to right. The writing system currently has no official standard.

When first created, the script was a pure alphabet: however, the language has come to include a default non written /a/, giving the script features of an abugida.

History 
When Jentich first created the alphabet, it was limited to 22 letters, in addition to the 10 digits. Vowel length was not written, letters could also represent their retroflex consonant equivalent, and aspirated consonants were written as digraphs, using the letter hamso. The letter na was used to represent both nasal consonants and vowel nasalisation, also through the use of digraphs. The velar nasal [ŋ] was shown with a digraph of the consonants na and gil, as in English /ng/. Tones were also not shown in the orthography, despite Sunwar being a tonal language. The letter secha was used to show both the voiceless postalveolar fricative [ʃ] and the voiceless alveolar sibilant [s].

During the tail end of the 20th century, users of the language added a further 11 letters into the script:

 aal - borrowed from Limbu to write /a/ with long vowel length
 kloko - to write the Glottal stop /ʔ/
 ṭentu, ṭhele, ḍonga - to improve clarity by having separate symbols for retroflexive consonants
 kha, chhelap, phar, thari - to improve clarity by having separate symbols for aspirated consonants
 sheyer - a letter for /ʃ/, to replace the digraph (sh)
 ngar - a letter for /ŋ/ to replace the digraph (ng)
 laissi - a character to denote Vowel length

Due to the lack of a set standard, the orthography can be vague, with digraphs still being used occasionally, and consonants still being used to denote retroflexives. 

Soon after the creation of the script, conferences were held in villages in Dolakha District, to promote it, and help shape its future.

Letters 

The laissi symbol is used to extend vowel length. It is a non-original character.

The symbol pwopwo is used to mark the Voiceless bilabial implosive /ƥ/. It is referred to as an 'auspicious symbol'. In spoken Sunuwar, the consonant is often said twice, and is often found in salutations and well wishes.

Numbers 
Sunuwar uses a set of ten numerals, in base 10, derived from Arabic numerals. They were also created by Jentrich.

Technological Support 
On 3 December 2021, ISO 15924 registered the Sunuwar Alphabet under the code 'sunu'.

On Jan 26, 2022, the Unicode Consortium announced via Twitter that a decision had taken place to include all 44 of Sunuwar's characters in a future version of Unicode

References 

Officially used writing systems of India
Writing systems